The Shadow Ministry of Michael Daley was the Labor opposition from November 2018 to March 2019, opposing the Berejiklian coalition government in the Parliament of New South Wales.

The shadow cabinet was made up of 23 members of the NSW Labor caucus. The shadow cabinet comprised 'spokespeople' or 'shadow ministers' who aim to hold the government of the day to account.

Members

See also
2019 New South Wales state election
First Berejiklian ministry
Shadow Ministry of Luke Foley
Shadow Ministry of Jodi McKay

References

Daley